Hyaenodontoidea ("hyena teeth") is a superfamily of extinct predatory mammals from extinct order Hyaenodonta. Fossil remains of these mammals are known from early Eocene to early Miocene deposits in North America, Europe and Asia.

Classification and phylogeny

Taxonomy
 Superfamily: †Hyaenodontoidea 
 Family: †Hyaenodontidae 
 Family: †Proviverridae

Phylogeny 
The phylogenetic relationships of superfamily Hyaenodontoidea are shown in the following cladogram:

See also
 Mammal classification
 Hyaenodonta

References

Hyaenodonts
Paleogene mammals of North America
Paleogene mammals of Asia
Paleogene mammals of Europe
Vertebrate superfamilies